Sadulshahar Tehsil is one of the 9 tehsils of Sri Ganganagar district of Rajasthan, India. It is located in the north-east area of the district. Sadulshahar city is headquarters of the tehsil. Its north border touches Fazilka District of Punjab. It is bordered to the south-east by  Hanumangarh district, a few kilometers border in south-west  with Padampur tehsil, west by Ganganagar tehsil.
A branch of the Bhakra canal irrigates farms of this tehsil. 

Bagri and Rajasthani are spoken here. 

Khairuwala is one of the villages in Sadulshahar Tehsil. Shasadulshahr DTO office has been started from 31 August 2021 for transport related work to the people of Sadulshahr Tehsil area. The transport district code of Sadulshahr DTO office is RJ-56.

Sri Ganganagar district
Tehsils of Rajasthan

Demographics

Languages

References